Bishop Henrik Gerner (9 December 1629 - 14 May 1700) was a Dane who studied theology and travelled extensively in England.  From 1656, at the age of 27, he became parish priest for Birkerød (north of Copenhagen) and in 1693 until his death was appointed bishop of Viborg.

Captivity
In 1659, during the Second Northern War, he was briefly imprisoned, tortured, held in chains and sentenced to death, by Swedish authorities for plotting the recapture of Kronborg - the sentence was not carried out after the Danish king Frederick III threatened reprisals. He was instead held imprisoned for eighteen weeks and had to pay a hefty fine before release. On release he took his 36 pound chains with him to Birkerød church where it is now displayed. The scars from his treatment in prison were a constant reminder for the rest of his life.
One of his fellow participants, Oluf van Steenwinckel, was not so lucky!

Intellectual interests
A man of lively literary interests, he published two works in Latin in 1662 promoting a form of social ethics. He translated the works of the Greek poet Hesiod and several lesser poets. He was in disagreement with his fellow priest Peder Syv's attempts at spelling reform of the Danish language, and an avid opponent of the use of foreign words in the Danish language.  He also contributed to Peder Lauridsen Kylling's botanical work Viridarium Danicum.

Commemoration

The street Henrik Gerners Vej in Birkerød was named in honour of Gerner. A granite bust of Gerner created by the sculptor Johannes Kragh was installed opposite Birkerød Church in 1917. A modern church extension housing the church administrative offices plus meeting rooms and a memorial hall was completed in 1979. A copy of Gerner's shackles hangs near the entrance and is used in historic reenactments.

See also
Articles on Danish Wikipedia
His greatgrandson :da:Henrik Gerner (skibskonstruktør)
:da:Henrik Gerner (biskop)

References

Citations in Danish
Salmonsens konversationsleksikon (under Projekt Runeberg) Both Gerners appear on the same page!
Bricka, C F in Projekt Runeberg, Dansk Biografisk Lexikon. Vol 5 Page 607 - 614 - Henrik Gerner
Bistrup Kirke (Birkerød) Gerner building

External links

 Henrik Gerner monument in Birkerød

1629 births
1700 deaths
18th-century Danish clergy
Danish Lutheran bishops